Czesław Gerwazy Białas ( in Szopienice –  in Katowice) was a Polish male weightlifter, who competed in the light-heavyweight and middle-heavyweight class and represented Poland at international competitions. He won the bronze medal at the 1959 World Weightlifting Championships in the 90 kg category. He participated at the 1952 Summer Olympics in the 82.5 kg event, at the 1956 Summer Olympics in the 90 kg event and at the 1960 Summer Olympics in the 90 kg event.

Białas also achieved the following podium finishes at European championships: bronze in the 1955 European Championships Light-Heavyweight class (385.0 kg); gold in the 1957 European Championships Middle-Heavyweight class (420.0 kg) and bronze in the 1959 European Championships Middle-Heavyweight class (422.5 kg).

References

External links
 

1931 births
1991 deaths
Polish male weightlifters
World Weightlifting Championships medalists
Sportspeople from Katowice
Olympic weightlifters of Poland
Weightlifters at the 1952 Summer Olympics
Weightlifters at the 1956 Summer Olympics
Weightlifters at the 1960 Summer Olympics
20th-century Polish people